Angela Wigger (born 2 January 1975) is a political economist at the Political Science Department at the Radboud University in the Netherlands.

Her current research focuses on analyzing the global economic crisis, crisis responses and political challenges to these responses from a historical materialist perspective. Focal points are the geopolitics of industrial and antitrust policy, industrial reshoring attempts, the "competitiveness" fetish, internal devaluation and debt-led accumulation in the age of rentier capitalism. 

Angela Wigger has conducted extensive research on capitalist restructuring of postwar Europe, industrial relations and the neoliberalisation of EU competition regulation, and financialisation processes. She is the co-author of The Politics of European Competition Regulation. A Critical Political Economy Perspective, with H. Buch-Hansen , and she has published amongst others in journals such as New Political Economy, Review of International Political Economy, the Journal of Common Market Studies, New Political Sciences, Capital & Class, Journal of European Integration, Comparative European Politics, Economy & Society and the Journal of International Relations and Development, Geoforum and Globalizations.

She has worked at the Political Science Department at the Vrije Universiteit Amsterdam from 2003 to 2007, where she obtained her PhD. Her dissertation was titled 'Competition for Competitiveness. The Politics of Transformation of the EU Competition Regime' – with Prof. dr. Henk Overbeek and Prof. dr. Andreas Nölke as supervisors. She received a master's degree (cum laude) from the Vrije Universiteit Amsterdam.

She appears in Dutch and international media regularly.

Early life 
Wigger was born 2 January 1975 in Dierikon, Lucerne.

Affiliations
 Former chair of the Critical Political Economy Research Network (CPERN) @ European Sociological Association (ESA)
 Founding member of the Amsterdam Research Centre for International Political Economy (ARCIPE)
 Supervisory board member of the Centre for Research on Multinational Corporations (SOMO)
 Member of the editorial board of Capital & Class
 Co-editor of the book series Progress in Political Economy

Publications

Books
 The Politics of European Competition Regulation. A Critical Political Economy Perspective (2011), with H. Buch-Hansen. New York and London: Routledge/RIPE Series in Global Political Economy.

Book chapters

 (2022) Competition Laws and Their Enforcement in the Project of European Integration: An artefact of ordoliberal influence? Chapter 27 in: T. Biebricher, P. Nedergaard and W. Bonefeld (2022) The Oxford Handbook of Ordoliberalism. Oxford: Oxford Univerisity Press. Pp.: 405-415.

 (2021) La politica industriale dell 'UE tra neo-autoritarismo neoliberale e alternative possibili. In A. Cozzolino, and D. (des) Giannone EUrope. Fratture nell'Unione. L'Europa dentro le crisi del XXI secolo. MIMESIS: Milan.
 (2021) Lobbying in the EU: How much Power for Big Business? In A. Dür and H. Zimmerman (eds) Key Controversies in European Integration. Palgrave McMillan. With L. Horn. 
 (2021) Competition Laws and their Enforcement in the US and Europe: Origins, Evolution and Contestation. In A. Kellow, T. Porter and K. Ronit (eds). Handbook of Business and Public Policy. Edward Elgar.
 (2019) The new EU industrial policy: Authoritarian neoliberal structural adjustment and the case for alternatives. In I. Bruff and C.B. Tansel (2019) Authoritarian Neoliberalism: Philosophies, Practices, Contestations. New York: Routledge, Rethinking Globalization Series.
 (2019) Vom beschränkenden Dissens zur desintegrierenden Polarisierung. Legitimitätsprobleme der Europäischen Union in der Eurokrise. In L. Bieling and S. Guntrum (eds) Transformation der Economic Governance in der EU. Globale Politische Ökonomie/Springer VS. With N. Huke.
 (2019) The bed you made. Social democracy and industrial policy in the EU. In D.J. Bailey and C. Hay (eds.), Diverging Capitalisms. Britain, the City of London and Europe. Building a Sustainable Political Economy: SPERI Research and Policy. Chapter 8. London: Palgrave McMillan. With L. Horn.
 (2018) The EU's Competitiveness Fetish: Industrial Renaissance Through Internal Devaluation, Really? In B. Jessop and K. Knio (eds) Crises, Construals, and Lessons. Crisis Dynamics and the Pedagogy of Crisis. New York: Routledge.
 (2018) Out of Amsterdam! Beyond the boundaries of (transnational) capitalist class formation. In B. Jessop and H. Overbeek (eds) Transnational Capital and Class Fractions. The Amsterdam School Perspective Reconsidered. New York: Routledge RIPE Series. With L. Horn.
 (2017) EU competition rules and the European integration project. In N. Zahariadis and L. Buonanno (eds) Routledge Handbook on European Public Policy. New York: Routledge. With H. Buch-Hansen.
 (2017) Debunking the myth of ordoliberal influence on European integration: The example of EU competition regulation. In C. Joerges and J. Hien (eds) Ordoliberalism, Law and the Rule of Economics. London: Hart Publishing.
 (2016) Taking critical ontology seriously. Implications for Political Science Methodology. Chapter threein: H. Keman and J. Woldendorp (eds) Handbook of research methods and applications in political science, Edward Elgar. ISBN 978 1 78471 081 1. With L. Horn.
 (2016) Business as usual - the EU is (still) driven by corporate interests. Chapter 7 in: A. Dür and H. Zimmerman (eds) Key Controversies in European Integration. Palgrave McMillan. With L. Horn.
 (2015) Alternatives to neoliberal austerity: redefining a progressive structural reforms agenda to reduce inequalities and promote jobs, growth and social investment. In C. Reuter, R. Bazillier, G. Cozzi, A. Crespy, F. De Ville, A. Wigger, M. Claassens, B. Saenen and E.M. Schneider (eds) Progressive Structural Reforms. Proposals for European Reforms to Reduce Inequality.Poland: Aspra-JR. With Bazillier, R. Cozzi, G. Crespy, A., and F. De Ville.
 (2015) Enhancing Competitiveness in Response to the Crisis. A Wrong and Dangerous Obsession, in: J. Jaeger and E. Springer (eds) Asymmetric Crisis in Europe and Possible Futures. Critical Political Economy and Post-Keynesian Perspectives. New York: Routledge/RIPE Series in Global Political Economy.
 (2015) EU Competition Regulation. A Case of Authoritarian Neoliberalism? in E. Hartmann and P.F. Kjaer (eds)The Evolution of Intermediary Institutions in Europe. From Corporatism to Governance. Houndmills, Basingstoke: Palgrave McMillan. With H. Buch-Hansen.
 (2015) Eşitsiz Gelişim ve AB'nin Tasarruf Politikalarına Karşı Siyasal Direniş. In L. Pradella and T. Marois (eds) Kutuplaştiran Kalkinma. Neoliberalizme Karşı Alternatifler ve Kriz. Ankara: NotaBene Yayınevi. With L. Horn.
 (2014) Reply: Breaking the Heartland. Creating the Precariat in the U.S. Lower Rust Belt.In: M. Johnson (ed.) Precariat: Labour, Work and Politics. New York: Routledge.
 (2014) Uneven Development and Political Resistance Against EU Austerity Politics. In L. Pradella and T. Marois (eds) Polarizing Development. Alternatives to Neoliberalism and the Crisis. London: Pluto Press. With L. Horn.
 (2013) "The Political Interface of Financialisation and the Regulation of Mergers and Acquisitions in the EU". Chapter 6 in U. Aydin and K.P. Thomas (eds.) Globalization and EU Competition Policy. New York and London: Routledge. 93-11.
 (2012) EU Competition Policy and the Ascendancy of Neoliberalism in P. Nousios, H. Overbeek and A. Tsokalis Globalisation and European Integration. Critical Approaches to Regional Order and International Relations. London and New York: Routledge (Warwick Studies in Globalisation). With Hubert Buch-Hansen.
 (2012) The unfolding contradictions of neoliberal competition regulation and the global economic crisis. A missed opportunity for change? Chapter 1 in H. Overbeek and B. van Apeldoorn (eds) 'Neoliberalism in Crisis, Basingstoke: Palgrave McMillan.
 (2011) Unravelling the Political Role of Experts and Expertise in the Professional Services Industry. Chapter 7 in B. Reinalda The Ashgate Research Companion to Non-State Actors. Aldershot: Ashgate.
 (2008) 'Exporting Europe's Core Business? The External Dimension of EU Competition Policy. In: J. Orbie, (ed.) Europe's Global Role: External Policies of the European Union. Aldershot: Ashgate Publishing.
 (2007) Towards A Market-Based Approach: The Privatization and Micro-Economization of EU Antitrust Law Enforcement. Chapter 6. In: B. van Apeldoorn, A. Nölke and H. Overbeek 'The Transnational Politics of Corporate Governance Regulation', New York and London: Routledge.

Selected articles 

 El que fan a les ombres: La creació de deute i les crisis capitalistes (2022). Catarsi 7(2022): 63-68. With R. Fernandez.

 The New EU Industrial Policy: Smart Specialisation Fortifying Capitalist Unevenness (2022) Blog in Journal of Common Market Studies, 29 August.
 The new EU industrial policy and deepening structural asymmetries: Smart Specialisation not so smart.(2022)  Journal of Common Market Studies. 61(1): 20-37. 
 Continuing to fight the beast of the apocalypse: Reasons for a critical political economy perspective (2022). Global Political Economy 1(1): 188–196.
 Una valoración crítica de lo que podría ser una economía política anarquista(2022). Instituto de Ciencias Económicas y de la Autogestión.

 Housing as a site of accumulation in Amsterdam and the creation of surplus populations. (2021) Geoforum. https://doi.org/10.1016/j.geoforum.2020.10.007
 De noodzaak voor een radicaal links antwoord op het neoliberaal kapitalisme (2021). S&D. With R. Fernandez.
The new EU Industrial Policy: Authoritarian Neoliberal Structural Adjustment and the Case for Alternatives. (2019) Globalizations. https://doi.org/10.1080/14747731.2018.1502496
Neoliberale Industriepolitik im sozialen Schafspelz. Ein Nachruf auf die Europäische Sozialdemokratie (2019). PROKLA. Zeitschrift für kritische Sozialwissenschaft 49(196): 407-425. With L. Horn.
Studying Capitalist Dystopias and Avenues for Change (2019). openDemocracy. With D. Bailey.
 The Political Economy of EU Competition Rule Export: Unravelling the dynamics of variegated convergence in Serbia and Turkey. (2018) Journal of International Relations and Development. With J. Maisenbacher.
 Too Big to Control? The politics of mega-mergers and why the EU is not stopping them (2017). Corporate Europe Observatory, Brussels. With H. Buch-Hansen.
Understanding the Competition-Crisis Nexus. Revisiting US Capitalist Crises (2017). Rethinking Marxism 29(4): 556-573.
Politiek van cijferfetisjisme en permanente concurrentie. Spanning 19(3): 23.
 Lehman Brothers in the Dutch offshore financial centre: The role of shadow banking in increasing leverage and facilitating debt (2016), with R. Fernandez. Economy and Society 45(3-4): 407-430 
 From dissent to resistance. Locating patterns of horizontalist self-management crisis responses in Europe . Comparative European Politics. DOI: 10.1057/s41295-016-0076-4.
 Capitalism and Competition Regulation in Europe. A Synopsis (2016), with H. Buch-Hansen. E-International Relations.  
A ascensão da regulação concorrencial de caráter neoliberal na Comunidade Europeia. Direito & Práxis 7(4): 610-642.
 Anarchism as emancipatory theory and praxis. Implications for critical research (2016). Capital & Class 40(1): 129–145.
Capitalism and Competition Regulation in Europe: A Synopsis. E-International Relations (E-IR) January. With H. Buch-Hansen.
 A critical appraisal of what could be an anarchist political economy (2014). Ephemera. Theory and Politics in Organisation 14(4): 737-49.
 Explaining (Missing) Regulatory Paradigm Shifts: EU Competition Regulation in Times of Economic Crisis (2014), with H. Buch-Hansen. New Political Economy 19(1): 113–137.
De mythe van 'competitiveness' als uitweg uit de crisis. Volonté Générale. Debat. Visie. Toekomst, 2 (Mei-Juni).
 Competition, the global crisis and alternatives to neoliberal capitalism. A critical engagement with anarchism (2013), with H. Buch-Hansen. New Political Science: A Journal of Politics and Culture 35(4): 604–26.
Breaking the Heartland: Creating the Precariat in the U.S. Lower Rust Belt: A Response to Joseph J. Varga. Global Discourse. An Interdisciplinary Journal of current Affairs and Applied Contemporary Thought 3(3-4): 447-9.
Ungleiche Entwicklung und politischer Widerstand - auf zu einem europäischen Frühling? Das Argument. Zeitschrift für Philosophie und Sozialwissenschaften, 301(2013): 200-209. With L. Horn.
Reflections on competition, competition regulation and the current crises, Embedded in Business, Politics & Society, 3(1): 36-48. With H. Buch-Hansen.
'Crisis in Europa! Maar waar zijn de politicologen? Een verkenning van de kritische politieke economie in de Lage Landen', 2012(2) Res Publica.
 The Political Interface of Financialisation and the Regulation of Mergers and Acquisitions in the EU (2012) Journal of European Integration 34(6): 623–41.
 Revisiting 50 Years of Market-Making: The Neoliberal Transformation of EC Competition Policy (2010), with H. Buch-Hansen. Review of International Political Economy 17(1): 20–44.
De EU en de financieel-economische crisis. Business as usual of breekpunt? Klasse, 10(2010): 1-3. With L. Horn.
Routledge Handbook of International Political Economy (IPE): IPE as a Global Conversation' by M. Blyth (ed), Governance. An International Journal of Policy, Administration and Institutions, 23(1):198-200.
 The Political Role of Transnational Experts in Shaping EU Competition Policy: Towards a Pan-European System of Private Enforcement (2009). Legisprudence 3(2): 251–75.
 The Privatisation of EU Business Regulation and the Erosion of Rhenish Capitalism: The Case of Antitrust Enforcement (2007), with A. Nölke. Journal of Common Market Studies 45(1): 487–513.
La crociata sulla convergenza: le politiche sulle leggi e pratiche della concorrenza globale. Il lavoro pubblico, No. 79, 15 June.
Review on the book by Indra de Soysa (2003) 'Foreign Direct Investment, Democracy and Development: Assessing the Contours, Correlates, and Concomitants of Globalization' (London: Routledge) in Political Studies Review, 2(3), September 2004.

References

External links 
 Website

1975 births
Living people
Swiss political scientists
Academic staff of Radboud University Nijmegen
Vrije Universiteit Amsterdam alumni
Swiss expatriates in the Netherlands
Women political scientists